Metropolitan Dionysius may refer to:

 Dionysius, Metropolitan of Kiev in 1384–1385
 Dionysius, Metropolitan of Moscow in 1581–1587